Paulo Sérgio Rodrigues Teles (born 30 March 1993) is a Portuguese footballer who plays as a central midfielder for A.D. Camacha.

Club career
Born in Funchal, Madeira, Teles finished his youth career with S.L. Benfica, arriving in the club's academy at the age of 16. In August 2012 he moved to Spain, signing a contract with Deportivo de La Coruña and making his debut as a senior with the reserves in Tercera División.

Teles played his first competitive match with the Galicians' first team on 11 September 2013, starting in a 2–2 draw against Córdoba CF in the second round of the Copa del Rey. After loan spells at Segunda División B sides CD Guijuelo and SD Compostela, he was released on 8 August 2015.

On 20 February 2016, Teles joined Bulgarian team PFC Lokomotiv Plovdiv. He scored his only First Professional Football League goal on 10 April, in the 3–1 home victory over PFC Slavia Sofia. 

Teles returned to his homeland in the summer of 2018, with S.C. Farense. He appeared in his only professional game in his country on 18 August, replacing Vanja Marković in the second half of a 3–1 away defeat of FC Porto B in the LigaPro.

Subsequently, Teles competed in the Portuguese lower leagues.

References

External links

1993 births
Living people
Sportspeople from Funchal
Portuguese footballers
Madeiran footballers
Association football midfielders
Liga Portugal 2 players
Campeonato de Portugal (league) players
C.S. Marítimo players
S.C. Farense players
S.C. Praiense players
Segunda División players
Segunda División B players
Tercera División players
Deportivo Fabril players
Deportivo de La Coruña players
CD Guijuelo footballers
SD Compostela footballers
First Professional Football League (Bulgaria) players
PFC Lokomotiv Plovdiv players
Portuguese expatriate footballers
Expatriate footballers in Spain
Expatriate footballers in Bulgaria
Portuguese expatriate sportspeople in Spain
Portuguese expatriate sportspeople in Bulgaria